The 1998 Oregon Ducks football team represented the University of Oregon during the 1998 NCAA Division I-A football season. They were led by head coach Mike Bellotti, who was in his 4th season as head coach of the Ducks. They played their home games at Autzen Stadium in Eugene, Oregon and participated as members of the Pacific-10 Conference.

Schedule

Rankings

Roster

Game summaries

USC

Source: USA Today
    
    
    
    
    
    

Oregon snapped a three-game losing streak to USC.

References

Oregon
Oregon Ducks football seasons
Oregon Ducks football